Lee David Robinson (born 2 July 1986 in Sunderland) is an English former professional goalkeeper. Robinson has previously played for Rangers, Greenock Morton, St Johnstone, Kilmarnock, Östersund, Raith Rovers, Queen of the South and Dunfermline Athletic.

Career

Rangers (first spell, including loan deals at other clubs)
Robinson made his first-team debut for Rangers on 7 May 2006, coming on as a substitute for Ronald Waterreus for the final twelve minutes of Rangers 2–0 win over Hearts. In December 2006, Robinson signed a new contract, to keep him at Rangers until the summer of 2009.

On 6 July 2007, it was announced that Robinson would spend the duration of the 2007–08 season on loan at Greenock Morton. In October 2008, Robinson moved to Scottish First Division side St Johnstone on a month-long loan deal as back-up to Alan Main. Robinson returned to Rangers on 31 December 2008.

Robinson later signed a loan deal to play for First Division club Queen of the South until the end of season 2008–09. Robinson played eighteen matches for the Dumfries club. At the end of the season, Robinson returned to Rangers. Robinson departed Rangers in the summer of 2009.

Kilmarnock

Robinson then signed for Kilmarnock on a free transfer. He made one first team appearance in his season at Rugby Park coming on as an early substitute for the injured Cammy Bell against Hibs. Robinson claimed man of the match for his performance after frustrating the opposition with a number of saves including a penalty save which would become a trademark of his game in the upcoming years.

Queen of the South (first spell)

Roddy McKenzie sustained a serious injury in the pre-season testimonial game for Jim Thomson against Rangers at Palmerston Park. The severity of the injury merited Queens signing Robinson to provide additional goalkeeping resource to the squad due to McKenzie's absence. Robinson re-joined Queens on a short-term deal, and this was extended for half of that particular season.

Robinson played 45 minutes in a pre-season friendly against Hamilton. Robinson then started in the League Cup win against Albion Rovers on 24 July 2010. Robinson, in the Challenge Cup second round penalty shoot-out win away at Dunfermline Athletic on 10 August 2010 was described by one reporter as, "excellent all night, he commands his box well and when called upon made a couple of fine saves one of which was superb and of course he made two crucial penalty saves too. So for that he'd be my man of the match."

Robinson continued to be selected for Queens cup ties with David Hutton being favoured for league matches. This led to Robinson playing in the Challenge Cup semi final 2–1 win away to Peterhead on 9 October 2010.

The club announced on 13 January 2011 that Robinson had left the club yet again. His last appearance was in the 2–1 Scottish Cup match versus Brechin City on the previous Tuesday night.

Queen of the South signed Robinson once again on 28 July 2011 for the new season after he had been training with the club for a short time. Robinson's first game of this spell was early in the season on 20 August 2011 in a 2–0 defeat to Ross County. After that Robinson established himself as the first choice goalkeeper at Queens. This led to McKenzie leaving the club by mutual consent on 10 January 2012.

In the 2012–13 season Robinson was successful in a second penalty shoot-out for Queens when eliminating Rangers from the Challenge Cup at Ibrox. Robinson then made his 100th appearance for the club in a derby match against Stranraer on 16 February 2013. Robinson was instrumental in the 6–5 penalty shoot-out when Queens won the Challenge Cup versus Partick Thistle on 7 April 2013  and with the club also winning the Second Division this gained the club their inaugural league and cup double. Robinson was described as a "hero" by Dumfries and Galloway Standard newspaper. At the end of the 2012–13 season, Robinson was named in the PFA Scotland Team of the Year for the Second Division alongside teammates Chris Mitchell, Mark Durnan, Chris Higgins, Daniel Carmichael and Nicky Clark. Robinson was also awarded SFL Goalkeeper of the Season. Robinson was offered a new contract by the club which he then turned down.

Östersunds FK

Robinson signed for Swedish club Östersund managed by Graham Potter. Östersunds were in Sweden's second tier at the time after promotion in each of the two seasons before under the Potter regime. They finished the season with Robinson in tenth position in the league.

Raith Rovers

On 7 February 2014 Robinson signed until the end of the season for Scottish club Raith Rovers. Having won the  2012–13 Scottish Challenge Cup final with Queen of the South he was instrumental in repeating this success against  Rangers putting in a man of the match performance in a 1–0 victory.

Rangers (second spell)
Robinson signed for Rangers in August 2014, as manager Ally McCoist sought cover for the injured Cammy Bell. After claiming the number one position, he played seven games under the caretaker management of Kenny McDowall. Robinson was released by Rangers at the end of the 2014–15 season.

Queen of the South (second spell)
After one season away from playing football to coach goalkeepers in the United States, Robinson returned to Scotland to sign a two-year contract with Queen of the South on 17 June 2016.

Robinson was appointed the Dumfries club's goalkeeping coach after the departure of Kenny Arthur to Partick Thistle.

On 9 September 2017, Robinson departed Queens by mutual consent, after not featuring since the start of the 2017–18 season. Robinson, having played for the Doonhamers more than any other club in his career thus far, after three spells in Dumfries, once on loan and two as a signed player, was the Queens goalkeeper in 124 league matches and 35 cup matches. This gives Robinson 159 appearances in all competitions.

Dunfermline Athletic
On 2 January 2018, Robinson signed a short-term deal with Scottish Championship club Dunfermline Athletic, making his debut on the same day in a local derby match against Falkirk. Robinson was named man-of-the-match after an assured debut. On the 17 May 2018 he signed a new one-year-deal with the club. During the 2018-19 season, Robinson played regularly for the Pars, until Johnston's departure following Alloa Athletic's 2–2 comeback draw on 5 January 2019. Robinson played in the following two matches, with his final appearance of the season being the 3–0 defeat at Raith Rovers in the Scottish Cup on 19 January 2019. Robinson was then released by Dunfermline Athletic at the end of that season.

Career statistics

Honours

Club
Queen of the South
Scottish Challenge Cup: 2012–13
Scottish Second Division: 2012–13

Raith Rovers
Scottish Challenge Cup: 2013–14

Individual
SFL Goalkeeper of the Season Award: 2012–13
PFA Scotland Team of the Year: 2012–13

References

1986 births
Living people
Footballers from Sunderland
English footballers
Rangers F.C. players
Greenock Morton F.C. players
St Johnstone F.C. players
Kilmarnock F.C. players
Queen of the South F.C. players
Raith Rovers F.C. players
Dunfermline Athletic F.C. players
Scottish Premier League players
Scottish Football League players
Scottish Professional Football League players
Association football goalkeepers